Eastville Historic District is a national historic district located at Eastville, Northampton County, Virginia. The district encompasses 315 contributing buildings, 7 contributing sites, and 4 contributing structures in the county seat of Northampton County.  The historic district contains a wide variety of residential, commercial, governmental, educational, social, religious, and funerary resources dating from 1731. Notable buildings include the courthouse (1731), clerk's office (c. 1750), Park Hall (c. 1750), Eastville Inn, Ingleside (c. 1810), Hickory Grounds (c. 1825), Maria Robins House (c. 1799), the Old Brick Store (c. 1820), Abdell Funeral Home (c. 1870), Edward Holland House (c. 1870, 1900), and Ailworth Hall (c. 1900).  Also located in the district are the separately listed Cessford, Eastville Mercantile, and James Brown's Dry Goods Store.

It was listed on the National Register of Historic Places in 2009.

References

External links
Courthouse Group Area Survey, U.S. Route 13, Eastville, Northampton County, VA at the Historic American Buildings Survey (HABS)

Historic districts in Northampton County, Virginia
Colonial architecture in Virginia
Victorian architecture in Virginia
National Register of Historic Places in Northampton County, Virginia
Historic American Buildings Survey in Virginia
Historic districts on the National Register of Historic Places in Virginia
1731 establishments in Virginia